Look Yan Kit (1849 — 1933) was a Cantonese dentist who came to Singapore in 1877 and found great success, having several high profile clientele. He was a millionaire.

Early life
Look was born in Guangzhou in 1849 and studied dentistry in Hong Kong.

Career
He came to Singapore in 1877, where he opened a dental clinic. His clinic was very successful, and attracted several high profile clientele, such as Abu Bakar of Johor and the Rajah of Solo. Due to the success of the clinic, he became a millionaire.

He owned 70 houses and two plantations. He was a founder of the Kwong Wai Shiu Hospital, and served on the hospital's management committee.

Personal life and death
He had four sons.

He died in 1933.

Yan Kit Road and the Yan Kit Swimming Complex were named after him.

References

1849 births
1933 deaths
People from British Singapore